Duke Xiang may refer to these rulers from ancient China:

Duke Xiang of Chen ( 10th century BC)
Duke Xiang of Qin (died 766 BC)
Duke Xiang of Qi (died 686 BC)
Duke Xiang of Song (died 637 BC)
Duke Xiang of Jin (died 621 BC)

See also
King Xiang (disambiguation)